Jonny Quest: Cover-Up at Roswell is a computer game released by Virgin Sound and Vision for the series The Real Adventures of Jonny Quest in August 1996.

Gameplay
Gameplay consists of clicking areas on images of locations—whether the Serengeti plains or Manhattan—to navigate paths in search of the objects. Occasionally, players encounter mini games, such as the task of guiding a diving bell away from rocks or shooting rats with a slingshot. Though characters appear on screen, there is no dynamic movement save for mini games. Allowing access to personal and government files at two points in the game, Roswell contains a vehicle guide to Real Adventures and several in-universe e-mails. These communications range from dossiers on the Quest team to a demand from a restaurant owner that Race reimburse him for damages caused when the bodyguard mistook a busboy for a criminal mastermind.

Plot

The Quests are hindered by Jeremiah Surd and the Men in Black of General Tyler, who plan to misuse the technology.

Development
Virgin created the game on a budget of $1 million, initially titling it Escape from Quest World. Developers recycled fifty minutes of footage and art from six season one episodes to construct a new story concerning alien artifacts and an alien's liberation from an autopsy at The Pentagon. Virgin handled all marketing, sales, and distribution, while Turner helped cross-promote the game. Turner New Media announced that Virgin's "non-violent adventure games suitable for pre-teen girls and boys, fits...our vision of what family entertainment should be." Virgin designed certain segments in 3D and included special Chromatek plastic viewing glasses with game copies. Footage voices were dubbed over by Michael Banyaer as Hadji, Charles Howerton as Dr. Quest, and the season two cast. Virgin hoped the game would provide 20–25 hours of game play for adults and 80-100 for children.

Reception
The game's music featured a "high-intensity orchestral sound" prone to monotony. One reviewer cited a lack of replay value and different modes of difficulty as weaknesses, but concluded that Roswell offered "good entertainment and variety". Critics were divided over the puzzles' difficulty, naming it both "ingenious" and "elementary". Peter Scisco of ComputerLife wrote that his kids had difficulty with the small mouse cursors, and criticized some of the puzzles for relying on "reflexes, not logical thinking." FamilyPC's testers agreed that the early puzzles were difficult but offered a sense of achievement. Entertainment Weekly's reviewer found the challenges too easy, considering them unimaginative "Pac-Man rip-offs and dopey jigsaws," and rated the game B+. Scisco appreciated the nonviolent content and the inclusion of Jessie's strong female character, but named the extraterrestrial story "too familiar". The Sydney Morning Herald warned against buying the game for children "scared easily by baddies," but recommended it for children who would enjoy mental challenges. A critic for USA Today warned that players who aren't fans of the show may find waiting through the many video clips and cut scenes tedious. A reviewer for the New York Daily News wrote that New York City was depicted as "teeming with gangs of wilding youths and set in a bleak, roach-infested urban blight of a stereotype most New Yorkers might find grossly exaggerated; maybe even insulting." The reviewer considered some of the puzzles too difficult for children, but forecast teenage enjoyment. Though he enjoyed using the game's three-dimensional glasses, he suffered a headache after quitting the game. After navigating the first few puzzles, a critic for The Age asked, "Who said this was just for kids?"

References

External links

1996 video games
Classic Mac OS games
Windows games
Video games based on Hanna-Barbera series and characters
Jonny Quest
Video games about alien visitations
Video games developed in the United States